The Kawasaki Heavy Industries & CSR Qingdao Sifang C151B is the fifth generation electric multiple unit rolling stock in operation on the North–South and East–West lines of Singapore's Mass Rapid Transit (MRT) system, manufactured by Kawasaki Heavy Industries (KHI) & CRRC Qingdao Sifang under Contract 151B. 45 trains were purchased and all of them have been delivered to Singapore as of 12 April 2017. SMRT took delivery of the first 2 train cars on 21 May 2015. These trains increased frequency for the two MRT lines, North–South and East–West lines. Majority of these trains operate on the North–South Line, with a few operating on the East–West Line.

These trains retain the same IGBT-VVVF traction equipment found on the earlier C751B and C151A sets, also featuring SMRT's "Pixels" livery introduced on the Bukit Panjang LRT C801A. These trains are the first to be fitted with STARiS 2.0, which is embedded in the door's overhead panels, as factory stock and also the first amongst the rolling stock used on the North–South and East–West lines to have electric door actuators rather than the traditional pneumatic door actuators on previous generations of rolling stock, allowing smoother and more reliable door operations, reducing delays. The first C151B train (Set 601/602) made its debut on the North–South Line on 16 April 2017.

Although there were some C151Bs housed in Tuas Depot since the inception of the Tuas West Extension, C151Bs did not begin revenue service on the full-stretch of the East–West line only until 6 May 2018, when the line switched to the new signalling system. C151Bs running on the EWL before that only ran on the Tuas West Extension, between Gul Circle and Tuas Link. Only that section had the new signalling system installed. On 27 May 2018, all 45 C151B trains have entered service on the North–South and East–West lines.

Tender
In the turnkey Contract C151B, 3 tenderers were shortlisted – Kawasaki Heavy Industries Ltd/Kawasaki Heavy Industries (Singapore) Pte Ltd Consortium, CRRC Zhuzhou/Siemens, and Construcciones y Auxiliar de Ferrocarriles. On 23 August 2012, the Land Transport Authority (LTA) awarded the tender to Kawasaki Heavy Industries at a price of S$281,508,884.00. Subsequently, the tender results were released to the public on 27 August 2012.

Manufacturing process
Kawasaki will be responsible for the overall project management, design, manufacturing of bogies and procurement of major components. CRRC Sifang will be in charge of manufacturing, final fitting and assembly of complete MRT trains and factory testing. Kawasaki (Singapore) will be responsible for the delivery of complete MRT trains to the depot, on-site testing and commissioning. The new MRT trains are scheduled to be delivered to Singapore from 2015 onwards.

Equipment

Main propulsion controller
The C151B trains is the third commuter type Electric Multiple Unit (EMU) after the C751B and C151A trains which features electric systems fully manufactured by Fuji Electric. These electric systems are made in Japan. Propulsion is controlled by VVVF Inverter with 2-level IGBT semiconductor controller, rated at 415 kVA. Each inverter unit controls two motors on one bogie (1C2M), and one motor car features two of such units. Motors are three-phase AC induction type, model MLR109, with a maximum output of 140 kW.

STARIS 2.0

Instead of other trains which use the older STARIS system, the C151B is the first train type equipped with STARIS 2.0 which consists of 2 LCD screens displaying the travel information, such as the upcoming stations the train will arrive at, door closing warnings and attractions nearby the station.

Train Formation
The configuration of a C151B in revenue service is DT–M1–M2+M2–M1–DT

The car numbers of the trains range from x601 to x690, where x depends on the carriage type. Individual cars are assigned a 4 digit serial number. A complete six-car trainset consists of an identical twin set of one driving trailer (DT) and two motor (M) cars permanently coupled together.
For example, set 617/618 consists of carriages 3617, 1617, 2617, 2618, 1618 and 3618.

 The first digit identifies the car number, where the first car has a 3, the second has a 1 & the third has a 2.
 The second digit is always a 6, part of the identification numbers
 The third digit and fourth digit are the train identification numbers. A full-length train of 6 cars have 2 different identification numbers. For example, 629/630 (normal coupling) or 629/640 (cross coupling).
 Kawasaki and CSR Qingdao Sifang built sets 601–690

Livery
Currently, it is the second train with SMRT's new white pixelated livery with red, yellow and black colour scheme, which is similar to Bukit Panjang LRT's C801A, as compared to the older SMRT trains. The C151B trains are the first trains to have a full white front unlike the older batch of trains with a black front. The first eight trains received the new livery with the 1st Generation SMRT logos, the ninth train received the 2nd Generation SMRT logos while the subsequent 36 trains received the 3rd Generation SMRT logos.

References

External links

Both orders for Singapore Subway Train 132 LTA

Mass Rapid Transit (Singapore) rolling stock
Kawasaki multiple units
Train-related introductions in 2017
750 V DC multiple units
CRRC multiple units